James Weinstein may refer to:

James Weinstein (author) (1926–2005), journalist
James Weinstein (New Jersey official), transportation executive
James N. Weinstein, American health executive
James Weinstein (legal scholar), American legal scholar